Rendez-vous is the debut studio album by Italian singer In-Grid. It was released on 14 April 2003, by ZYX Music. The first two singles Tu es foutu" and "In-Tango" gained European success, topping the charts in several countries. The album received platinum certifications in Poland and Russia.

In 2004, the album won in the nomination "Foreign Album of the Year" of the Russian .

Track listing

Charts

Weekly charts

Year-end charts

Certifications

References

2003 debut albums
In-Grid albums
ZYX Music albums